Babajan may refer to:

People
Hazrat Babajan (c. 1806-1931), Indian religious figure
Abdul Wahid Baba Jan, Afghan general
Baba Jan (politician), political activist from Gilgit-Baltistan administrative territory of Pakistan

Places
Tsapatagh, Armenia - formerly Babajan
Babajan, Lorestan, village in Iran

See also
Baba Jan (disambiguation)